Hugh Crauford Rae (22 November 1935 – 24 September 2014) was a Scottish author of romantic historical fiction novels and thrillers. He wrote fiction using several pseudonyms, including Jessica Stirling, Robert Crawford, James Albany, Stuart Stern and R. B. Houston.

Life
Rae was born in Knightswood, outside Glasgow, in 1935, the son of a riveter. He lectured in creative writing at Glasgow University adult education classes.

Writing
Rae was known for writing fiction, such as the thriller The Marksman later televised by the BBC. He was better known for his romantic historical novels written under the name Jessica Stirling.

Jessica Stirling novels
After Rae had written a few crime thrillers, a publisher suggested he collaborate with a romantic short story writer, Peggy Coghlan, to produce a historic romantic novel set in the Victorian period. The publisher required this to be published under a female name, and the writers picked the name Jessica Stirling at a meeting in a Stirling coffee shop.

Rae and Coghlan wrote seven Jessica Stirling novels together. Then, Rae went on to write another 30 such saga novels on his own, at a rate of two a year, published by Hodder & Stoughton.

Rae's real identity first became widely known in 1999, after 25 years of writing Jessica Stirling novels, when The Wind from the Hills was shortlisted for the Romantic Novelists' Association Romantic Novel of the Year prize.

Works
 Skinner, 1966
 Night Pillow, 1967
 A Few Small Bones, 1968
 The Interview, 1969
 The Marksman, 1971
 The Shooting Gallery, 1972
 The Rock Harvest, 1973
 The Rookery, 1974
 Harkfast, 1976
 Sullivan, 1978
 The Travelling Soul, 1978
 The Haunting of Waverley Falls, 1980
 Privileged Strangers, 1982

as James Albany
 Warrior Caste, 1982
 Mailed Fist, 1982
 Deacon's Dagger, 1982

as Robert Crawford
 The Shroud Society, 1969
 Cockleburr, 1969
 Kiss the Boss Goodbye, 1970
 The Badger's Daughter, 1971
 Whiphand, 1972

 as R. B. Houston
 Two for the Grave, 1972

 as Stuart Stern
 The Minotaur Factor, 1977
 The Poison Tree, 1978

as Jessica Stirling with Peggie Coghlan
 The Spoiled Earth, 1974
 The Dresden Finch, 1976
 The Hiring Fair, 1976
 The Dark Pasture, 1977
 The Deep Well at Noon, 1979
 The Blue Evening Gone, 1981

References

1935 births
2014 deaths
Writers from Glasgow
20th-century Scottish novelists
21st-century Scottish novelists
Scottish crime fiction writers
Scottish romantic fiction writers
Tartan Noir writers